Guwahati Food Awards (GFA) is an annual food award in India instituted in 2015. It aims to recognize superior services and achievements in the food and beverage industry of Guwahati, India.

The winners get selected through a multi-phase process that involves public voting, food tasting and jury visits.

History
It was established in 2015 by G Plus.

Editions

2018 
This edition received over 157 nominations across 23 categories. The jury of GFA 2018 includes Chef Faruk Ahmed, Dr. Geeta Dutta and Aabhishek Bedi Varma, a former chef of Taj Group of Hotels and headed by Suresh Hinduja, the CEO of Gourmet India. Kunal Vijaykar was a chief guest for the event.

Winners

2017 
GFA received 186 nominations across 25 categories in 2017. The special jury included Food critic and author Ashish Chopra and Suresh Hinduja, CEO of Gourmet India. Riyaaz Amlani, Restaurateur and President of National Restaurants Association of India (NRAI) was the Chief Guest for the event.

2016 
The second edition of Guwahati Food Awards was held at Vivanta by Taj, Guwahati with Chief Guest Chef Manjit Gill, Corporate Chef, ITC Hotels and President of Indian Federation of Culinary Associations (IFCA).

2015 
The first edition of Guwahati Food Awards was held at Radisson, Guwahati. The Chief Guest of the event was Sanjeev Pahwa - Senior Vice President – Asia for Carlson Rezidor Hotels.

See also

 Assamese cuisine
 Indian food
 Indian cuisine
 Food competition
 Curry Awards
 Guild of Fine Food

References

External links

Food and drink awards
Indian awards
Awards established in 2015
Recurring events established in 2015
2015 establishments in India